Barrington Somers James Pheloung (10 May 1954 – 1 August 2019) was an Australian composer based in the United Kingdom. He composed several television theme tunes and music, particularly for Inspector Morse and its follow-up series, Lewis, and prequel Endeavour.

Early life and studies
Pheloung was born 10 May 1954 in Manly, New South Wales, and grew up in Sydney's northern beaches suburbs. He was born to father John Pheloung who was of Irish and English descent, and mother Adel (nee Reber) Pheloung who was of German and Spanish descent. He began playing R&B guitar in clubs, but his discovery of Bach in his late teens drew him to the classical repertoire.

In 1972 at age of 18, Pheloung moved to London where he studied guitar, double bass, and composition at the Chiswick Music Centre, then part of Chiswick Polytechnic (now Brunel University), before proceeding to the Royal College of Music to study composition with John Lambert and guitar under John Williams and Julian Bream. There he also took instruction in conducting. In his second year, he received his first commission for a ballet score.

Composer
Pheloung is best known for the theme and incidental music to the Inspector Morse television series, for which he was nominated for Best Original Television Music at the British Academy Television Awards in 1991; the sequel  Lewis, and the prequel Endeavour. He also composed for dance companies such as the London Contemporary Dance Theatre, and for events including the opening night of the Millennium Dome. Pheloung also wrote the theme music for the BBC television series Dalziel and Pascoe.

His film work included Hilary and Jackie (1998), based on the life of the cellist Jacqueline du Pré, for which he was nominated for the Anthony Asquith Award for Film Music at the 52nd British Academy Film Awards. Other works include Truly, Madly, Deeply (1990), Twin Dragons (1992), Shopping (1994), Nostradamus (1994), The Mangler (1995), Touching Wild Horses (2002), Shopgirl (2005), Little Fugitive (2006) and A Previous Engagement (2008). He also composed the scores to Revolution Software's adventure games In Cold Blood and three Broken Sword video games.

Pheloung's other work included music for the Sydney Opera House's Twentieth Birthday Celebrations and he contributed to the music for the film Truly, Madly, Deeply, in which he also appeared. He composed the incidental music for the first series of Boon.

In 2009 he composed the music for 1983, the concluding episode of the Channel 4 drama series Red Riding.

Personal life and death
Pheloung married Anita Griffin in 1979, the couple had two children together, but the marriage ended in divorce. He later married Heather Lovejoy with whom he had a further two children.
He died in August 2019 at the age of 65 of respiratory failure. He was survived by his second wife and his four children.

Discography

 Red Riding, 2009
 Lewis, Music from Series 1 & 2, 2008
 And When Did You Last See Your Father? 2007
 Shopgirl, 2006
 The Magic of Inspector Morse, 2000
 Inspirations, 2001
 Hilary and Jackie, 1998
 The Passion of Morse, 1997
 The Essential Inspector Morse Collection, 1995
 Shopping, 1994
 Nostradamus, 1994
 Days of Majesty, 1993
 Inspector Morse Vol. 3, 1992
 Inspector Morse Vol. 2, 1992
 Inspector Morse Vol. 1, 1991

Credits
 
Endeavour, 2012–19
Red Riding, 2009
Incendiary, 2008
And When Did You Last See Your Father? 2007
Lewis, 2006–2015
Shopgirl, 2005
Touching Wild Horses, 2002
Hilary and Jackie, 1998
Dalziel and Pascoe, 1996-98
Twin Dragons, 1996
Saint-Ex, 1995
The Mangler, 1994
Nostradamus, 1994
The Legends of Treasure Island, 1993
Truly, Madly, Deeply, 1991
Portrait of a Marriage, 1990
Friendships’s Death, 1987
Inspector Morse, 1987–2000

Video games 

 Broken Sword: The Shadow of the Templars, 1996. 
 Broken Sword II: The Smoking Mirror, 1997.
In Cold Blood, 2000.
 Broken Sword 5: The Serpent's Curse, 2013–2014.

References

External links 
 
 
 Barrington Pheloung at the British Film Institute

1954 births
2019 deaths
Australian composers
Australian male composers
Australian emigrants to England
Inspector Morse
Musicians from Sydney
People educated at St Aloysius' College (Sydney)